The 1966 Davis Cup was the 55th edition of the Davis Cup, the most important tournament between national teams in men's tennis. 32 teams entered the Europe Zone, 8 teams entered the Eastern Zone, and 6 teams entered the America Zone.

For this year's competition the Europe Zone was split into two sub-zones. 16 teams competed in each sub-zone, with the winners of both sub-zones progressing to the Inter-Zonal Zone. This meant that 4 teams would now compete in the Inter-Zonal Zone for the right to challenge the defending champions Australia.

The United States defeated Mexico in the America Zone final, India defeated Japan in the Eastern Inter-Zonal final, and Brazil and West Germany were the winners of the two Europe sub-zones, defeating France and South Africa respectively.

In the Inter-Zonal Zone, India defeated West Germany and Brazil defeated the United States in the semifinals, and then India defeated Brazil in the final. India was then defeated by Australia in the Challenge Round. The final was played at Kooyong Stadium in Melbourne, Australia on 26–28 December.

America Zone

Draw

Final
United States vs. Mexico

Eastern Zone

Zone A

Zone B

Eastern Inter-Zonal Final
Japan vs. India

Europe Zone

Zone A

Zone A Final
France vs. Brazil

Zone B

Zone B Final
West Germany vs. South Africa

Inter-Zonal Zone

Draw

Semifinals
India vs. West Germany

Brazil vs. United States

Final
India vs. Brazil

Challenge Round
Australia vs. India

References

External links
Davis Cup Official Website

 
Davis Cups by year
Davis Cup
Davis Cup
Davis Cup
Davis Cup
Davis Cup
Davis Cup
Davis Cup
Davis Cup
1966 in German tennis